"Bad Blood" is a song by industrial metal band Ministry.

The song was the second single from the band's 1999 album Dark Side of the Spoon. The song is featured on the soundtrack for the film The Matrix. The song was nominated for the Grammy Award for Best Metal Performance at the 42nd Grammy Awards in 2000. This single also features the song "Happy Dust", an instrumental piece that was never released on any of the band's albums or compilations to date, aside from the Japanese edition of Dark Side of the Spoon. It was however used as the intro and outro for the Sphinctour DVD.

Track listing

Personnel
Ministry
Al Jourgensen – vocals, electronics
Louis Svitek – guitar
Paul Barker – bass, electronics
Rey Washam – drums

Additional
Ty Coon – vocals

References

External links
Official Music Video at YouTube

1999 singles
Ministry (band) songs
1999 songs
Warner Records singles
Songs written by Al Jourgensen
Songs written by Paul Barker
The Matrix (franchise) music